Denis Zeunert (12 July 1931 – 13 February 2009) was an Australian rules footballer who played with Carlton in the Victorian Football League (VFL). A strong player, his skill and fairness saw him run second in Carltons best and fairest twice. Playing on the half back flank, he combined with Peter Webster and John James to make one of the most formidable back lines in the league. John Nicholls once wrote that Zeunert would always do his circle work on the boundary, allowing him to cover plenty of ground. After his VFL career, he went on to coach the Hamilton Imperials in the Western District League.

Sources

Holmesby, Russell & Main, Jim (2007). The Encyclopedia of AFL Footballers. 7th ed. Melbourne: Bas Publishing.

External links

1931 births
2009 deaths
Australian rules footballers from Victoria (Australia)
Carlton Football Club players
Heywood Football Club players
Hamilton Imperials Football Club players